The Brazilian National Agency of Petroleum, Natural Gas and Biofuels ( - ANP) is the federal government agency linked to the Ministry of Mines and Energy responsible for the regulation of the oil sector.

See also

List of regulatory organizations of Brazil
Energy policy of Brazil
Petrobras
Operation Car Wash

References

External links
Official website in Portuguese
 Article on ANP's Brasil Round 5 Author's updated contact information at www.brazilawconsulting.com

Bioenergy organizations
Biofuel in Brazil
Energy in Brazil
Government agencies of Brazil
Energy regulatory authorities
Regulation in Brazil